The Daredevil Men is a 1972 British short subject detailing the activities of stunt performers and stunt arrangers featuring Tom Adams.

Plot
The film demonstrates how action scenes in a film are creating using stunt performers, editing and special effects.  Each bit in an action setpiece in an imaginary movie are demonstrated how they are created, then put together to demonstrate how they will look in the completed feature film.  Action includes unarmed combat, gunfights, the pyrotechnics of an electrocution scene, and a car and motorcycle chase.

Notes

External links
The Daredevil Men at BFI http://ftvdb.bfi.org.uk/sift/title/182074?view=credit

British short documentary films
1970s short documentary films
1972 films
Documentary films about the film industry
1970s English-language films
1970s British films